A rosette  is a small, circular device that is typically presented with a medal. The rosettes are either worn on the medal to denote a higher rank, or for situations where wearing the medal is deemed inappropriate, such as on a suit. Rosettes are issued in nations such as Belgium, France, Italy and Japan. Rosettes are also sometimes called bowknots, due to their shape.  Moreover, a large rosette is sometimes pinned onto the ribbon which suspends a medal, typically the Officer (and sometimes Grand Officer)'s badge of certain orders of chivalry.

Some small lapel rosettes are worn in the same manner as lapel pins. For instance, knights of the Order of the British Empire now wear a lapel rosette bearing the order's cross in the center, whereas previously this was a purely metallic lapel pin. While a metal lapel pin mounted on a silk rosette is considered a decoration of distinction, this is not always true of a metal emblem lacking the ribbon backing.

United States 

In the United States, the Medal of Honor is issued with a 1/2 inch light blue rosette with white stars, authorized for civilian wear as a lapel button.  Previously, the Purple Heart was also presented with a purple and white rosette, but now has been replaced by a metallic lapel pin. The lapel pin is designed to be a smaller version of the rectangular service ribbon, also for use on civilian wear. Most American military medals have the ribbon bar design scaled down to the size of a lapel pin.  Members of the Sons of the American Revolution wear small, blue-and-buff rosettes as lapel buttons.  The colors match those of the uniform of Gen. George Washington and the Continental Army.

Belgium 
A rosette adorns the ribbon of all national Orders of Merit (namely the Order of Leopold, the Order of the Crown, the Order of Leopold II, and the dormant Order of the African Star and Royal Order of the Lion) at the rank of Officer. Such rosette may also be worn in diminutive form on appropriate civilian dress. Ranks above that of Officer (Commander, Grand Officer and Grand Cross) may wear a rosette adorned with gold and/or silver bars (or "half-knots") on each side of the rosette on appropriate civilian dress. Such rosette also adorns ribbon bars worn on the semi-formal dress uniform.

France 

Several of the top decorations of France, including the Légion d'honneur and the Ordre national du Mérite, are presented with a rosette along with the medal. The Legion of Honor authorized a rosette for those who are the rank of officer or above. If the grade is higher, the rosette is adorned with gold and/or silver bars (or "half-knots") which are place beside each side of the rosette. The same manner is accorded to the Order of National Merit.  In occasions when ribbon bars are worn alone, the above-mentioned half-knots and/or rosettes are pinned onto the ribbon bars as appropriate to denote the wearer's grade.

United Kingdom 

In the United Kingdom, small silver rosettes can be added to the ribbons that are worn in place of medals.  Usually these indicate multiple award bars, the number of times a decoration for merit or distinguished service has been awarded.  (Exceptions are the George Cross and Victoria Cross, where the ribbons are issued only with miniatures of the medals attached.)  Holders of the 1914 Star, the 1939-45 Star, the Atlantic Star, the Pacific Star, the Burma Star, the South Atlantic Medal (awarded for service in the Falklands War), the Gulf War Medal 1991 and the Sierra Leone medal could also receive these rosettes if they met certain criteria for combat service.

Lineage societies 
Several American-based lineage societies provide a rosette as an insignia of membership for informal wear.

See also

Ribbon (award), for a different variety of rosette
Service lapel button (disambiguation)

References

Medals
Award items